Coleophora achilleae is a moth of the family Coleophoridae that is endemic to Greece.

References

External links

achilleae
Moths described in 2001
Moths of Europe
Endemic fauna of Greece